Beep: A Documentary History of Game Sound is a 2016 Canadian documentary film written and directed by Karen Collins, who, according to Dana Plank on the Journal of the Society for American Music, has published "some of the most influential texts on the history of game audio." The documentary examines the history of game sound design from penny arcades, pinball and video games up to 2015. The documentary was founded through Kickstarter, and features interviews with people involved in game sound design, such as: Marty O'Donnell, Nathan McCree, George Sanger, Nobuo Uematsu, Yoko Shimomura and Winifred Phillips among others.

It was awarded with the Best Editing film in the Melbourne Documentary Film Festival in 2016.

Cast
The following people were interviewed in the documentary:

 Becky Allen
 Yoshino Aoki
 Simon Ashby
 Clint Bajakian
 William 'Chip' Beaman
 Brendan Becker
 Erik Braa
 Anastasios Brakis
 Alexander Brandon
 Allister Brimble
 John Broomhall
 Tracy W. Bush
 Bryan Celano
 D.B. Cooper
 Michael Csurics
 Charles Deenen
 Peter Drescher
 Gordon Durity
 Mark Estdale
 Brad Fuller
 Scott Martin Gershin
 Jason Graves
 Andreas Hamm
 James Hannigan
 Lance Hayes
 Rich Heimlich
 Rudy Helm
 Spencer Hooks
 Steve Horowitz
 Shinji Hosoe
 Chris Huelsbeck
 Sam S. Hughes (Credited as Sam Hughes
 Noriyuki Iwadare
 Richard Jacques
 Damian Kastbauer
 Michael Kelly
 Hiroki Kikuta
 Penka Kouneva
 Michael Land
 Jennifer Lewis
 Levon Louis
 Richard Ludlow
 Peter McConnell
 Nathan McCree
 Dren McDonald
 Dan Miller
 Takuya Nakagami
 Koichi Namiki
 Michiko Naruke
 Graeme Norgate
 Martin O'Donnell
 Hisayoshi Ogura
 Joanna Orland
 Rebecca Parnell
 Leonard J. Paul
 Winifred Phillips
 Shannon Potter
 Jory K. Prum
 Tom Rettig
 Wilbert Roget II
 Arnie Roth
 Hitoshi Sakimoto
 Tom Salta
 George Alistair Sanger
 Nobuyoshi Sano
 Tenpei Sato
 Brian L. Schmidt
 Stephan Schutze
 Garry Schyman
 Tetsuya Shibata
 Yôko Shimomura
 Chanel Summers
 Yuji Takenouchi
 David E. Thiel
 Masanobu 'Tomi' Tomita
 Nobuo Uematsu
 David Viens
 David Warhol
 Jim Welch
 Tom White
 Guy Whitmore
 Alex Wilmer
 Nick Wiswell

References

External links

 
 

2016 films
2016 documentary films
Canadian documentary films
Documentary films about video games
2010s English-language films
2010s Canadian films